The following lists events that happened during 2013 in Tajikistan.

Incumbents
President: Emomali Rahmon
Prime Minister: Oqil Oqilov (until 23 November), Kokhir Rasulzoda (starting 23 November)

Events

February
 February 23 - Tajik Armed Forces Day celebrations.

November
 November 6 - Voters in Tajikistan go to the polls for a presidential election.

December
German authorities alleged that relatives and other people close to Tajikistan's president are driving stolen luxury cars from Germany, as a long-running criminal probe escalated into a diplomatic spat between two countries.

References

 
Years of the 21st century in Tajikistan
2010s in Tajikistan
Tajikistan
Tajikistan